Kelsey Laine Davis (born May 14, 1987) is an American soccer player from Thousand Oaks, California. She was a goalkeeper for the Boston Breakers and Chicago Redstars of Women's Professional Soccer and the United States U-23 women's national soccer team.

Career

National Team career
Davis played in the 2004 FIFA U-19 Women's World Championship in Thailand and the 2006 FIFA U-20 Women's World Championship in Russia.

In May 2009, Davis was named to the senior national team roster for two games against Canada. During an exhibition game with the United States U-23 women's national soccer team in June against F.C. Indiana, Davis fractured her jaw and was unable to compete with the U-23 team later that summer in England.

Davis returned to the U-23 national team in May 2010 and was the starting goalkeeper in two matches between the Germany U-23 national team and the South Korea U-20 national team, sharing the captain's armband with Lauren Fowlkes and Kylie Wright.

Professional career
Davis was drafted by the Chicago Red Stars at the 2010 WPS Draft, going 24th overall. After returning from national team duty in May 2010, Davis suffered an ACL injury that ended her first WPS season. Davis was signed by the Boston Breakers as a free agent on January 12, 2011.

References

External links
 
 2008 Portland player page
 2005 UCLA player page
 Davis' blog for NCAA.com
 Chicago Red Stars player profile
 Going Pro: Kelsey Davis, American Soccer, and Emerging Adulthood
 Audio Interview with Kelsey Davis at Cross-Conference Collector

1987 births
Living people
Portland Pilots women's soccer players
UCLA Bruins women's soccer players
American women's soccer players
Chicago Red Stars players
Boston Breakers players
Women's association football goalkeepers
United States women's under-20 international soccer players